Parmenion was an architect, who was employed by Alexander the Great in the building of Alexandria. He was entrusted with the superintendence of the works of sculpture, especially in the temple of Serapis (Serapeum), which came to be called by his name Parmenionis. Clement of Alexandria, however, ascribes the great statue of Serapis to Bryaxis. He is also mentioned by Vitruvius.

References

External links
Thessaloniki Science Center & Technology Museum - NOESIS-Ancient Greek scientists (Parmenio)

Ancient Greek architects
Architects of Alexander the Great
Ancient Macedonian scientists
Ancient Alexandrians
4th-century BC people